The 1999 Volvo PGA Championship was the 45th edition of the Volvo PGA Championship, an annual professional golf tournament on the European Tour. It was held 28–31 May at the West Course of Wentworth Club in Virginia Water, Surrey, England, a suburb southwest of London.

Colin Montgomerie successfully defended his 1998 title to claim a five stroke victory over Mark James.

Course layout

Past champions in the field 
Twelve former champions entered the tournament.

Made the cut

Missed the cut

Nationalities in the field

Round summaries

First round 
Thursday, 28 May 1999

Second round 
Friday, 29 May 1999

Third round 
Saturday, 30 May 1999

Final round 
Sunday, 31 May 1999

References 

BMW PGA Championship
Golf tournaments in England
Volvo PGA Championship
Volvo PGA Championship
Volvo PGA Championship